Shoja may refer to:
 Shoja, East Azerbaijan
 Shoja, Kermanshah
 Shoja Rural District, in East Azerbaijan Province